Lentinus megacystidiatus is a species of edible mushroom in the family Polyporaceae, first found in northern Thailand.

References

Further reading
Senthilarasu, Gunasekaran. "the lentinoid fungi (Lentinus and Panus) from Western ghats, India." (2015).
Quél, C. E. R. I. O. P. O. R. U. S. "Zmitrovich IV, Kovalenko AE Lentinoid and polyporoid fungi, two generic conglomerates containing important medicinal mushrooms in molecular perspective International Journal of Medicinal Mushrooms." International Journal of Medicinal Mushrooms (2015).
Njouonkou, André-Ledoux, Roy Watling, and Jérôme Degreef. "Lentinus cystidiatus sp. nov.(Polyporaceae): an African lentinoid fungus with an unusual combination of both skeleto-ligative hyphae and pleurocystidia." Plant Ecology and Evolution 146.2 (2013): 240–245.

Polyporaceae
Fungi described in 2011
Fungi of Asia